The 2006 Holsten Premier League the second year of the Professional Darts Corporation's popular darts league. The 2006 league was launched with the top six players in the PDC world rankings and the addition of a wildcard player, Raymond van Barneveld who decided to switch from the British Darts Organisation just weeks after reaching their 2006 World Championship final.

Barneveld, a four-times BDO World Champion went on to achieve the perfect nine-dart finish on 23 March against Peter Manley, on the fifth night of the 2006 Premier League at the Bournemouth International Centre. It was the same night that he faced Phil Taylor for the first time since his switch, the match ended in a 7–7 draw.

Taylor and Barneveld dominated the league stages, with both players winning every match in the league phase against the other 5 players in the league. Taylor came out on top 8–6 in their other meeting in Doncaster.

Given the form of Taylor and Barneveld in the group matches, there was much anticipation of a clash between the two in the final. However, it failed to materialise as Roland Scholten averaged 104.13 in the semi-final to hammer Barneveld (average 91.79) by 11 legs to 3. Phil Taylor averaged 105.03 in his 11–3 semi-final win over Colin Lloyd (average 99.42).

Phil Taylor successfully defended his title by seeing off Scholten in the final by 16 legs to 6. Taylor's average in the final was 101.41 to Scholten's 92.01. 

Barneveld and Taylor would ultimately have their next meeting in the finals of the 2007 PDC World Darts Championship, with Barneveld ending Taylor's three-year reign as champion.

Format 
The format had a slight change from 2005. Previously, all twelve legs of a match had to be completed – regardless of whether a winner had already been determined. From 2006, a match would finish when a player reached the 8 legs victory target, unless the match reached 7–7 when the points would be shared and the match drawn.

Venues
Like the inaugural Premier League Darts event, all 11 venues were used, but this time venues in Scotland (Aberdeen) and Wales (Newport) were also used.

Results

16 February – Week 1 
 King George's Hall, Blackburn

23 February – Week 2 
 Seaburn Leisure Centre, Sunderland

2 March – Week 3 
 AECC, Aberdeen

16 March – Week 4 
 Wolverhampton Civic Hall, Wolverhampton

23 March – Week 5 
 Bournemouth International Centre, Bournemouth

Nine dart finish 
The Premier League's first nine-dart finish occurred, when Raymond van Barneveld hit one during the ninth leg of his match against Peter Manley, checking out with T20, T19 and D12.

30 March – Week 6 
 Sands Centre, Carlisle

6 April – Week 7 
 Newport Centre, Newport

20 April – Week 8 
 The Dome Leisure Centre, Doncaster

27 April – Week 9 
 Stevenage Arts & Leisure Centre, Stevenage

4 May – Week 10 
 Rivermead Centre, Reading

Play-offs – 29 May
 Plymouth Pavilions, Plymouth

Table and streaks

Table

NB: LWAT = Legs Won Against Throw. Players separated by +/- leg difference if tied.

Streaks

NB: W = Won
D = Drawn
L = Lost
N/A = Did not play

Player statistics

The following statistics are for the league stage only. Playoffs are not included.

Phil Taylor
Longest unbeaten run: 12
Most consecutive wins: 6
Most consecutive draws: 1
Most consecutive losses: 0
Longest without a win: 1
Biggest victory: 8–1 (v. Colin Lloyd and v. Peter Manley)
Biggest defeat: Player Undefeated

Raymond van Barneveld
Longest unbeaten run: 7
Most consecutive wins: 4
Most consecutive draws: 1
Most consecutive losses: 1
Longest without a win: 1
Biggest victory: 8–1 (v. Ronnie Baxter)
Biggest defeat: 6–8 (v. Phil Taylor)

Roland Scholten
Longest unbeaten run: 4
Most consecutive wins: 2
Most consecutive draws: 2
Most consecutive losses: 4
Longest without a win: 4
Biggest victory: 8–3 (v. Wayne Mardle)
Biggest defeat: 3–8 (v. Raymond van Barneveld (twice) and v. Phil Taylor)

Colin Lloyd
Longest unbeaten run: 2
Most consecutive wins: 1
Most consecutive draws: 1
Most consecutive losses: 2
Longest without a win: 3
Biggest victory: 8–4 (v. Ronnie Baxter and v. Wayne Mardle)
Biggest defeat: 1–8 (v. Phil Taylor)

Ronnie Baxter
Longest unbeaten run: 2
Most consecutive wins: 1
Most consecutive draws: 1
Most consecutive losses: 2
Longest without a win: 5
Biggest victory: 8–3 (v. Colin Lloyd and v. Peter Manley)
Biggest defeat: 1–8 (v. Raymond van Barneveld)

Peter Manley
Longest unbeaten run:  2
Most consecutive wins: 2
Most consecutive draws: 0
Most consecutive losses: 5
Longest without a win: 5
Biggest victory: 8–3 (v. Wayne Mardle)
Biggest defeat: 1–8 (v. Phil Taylor)

Wayne Mardle
Longest unbeaten run: 3
Most consecutive wins: 1
Most consecutive draws: 3
Most consecutive losses: 5
Longest without a win: 9
Biggest victory: 8–5 (v. Ronnie Baxter)
Biggest defeat: 2–8 (v. Phil Taylor)

Top match Averages
Darts averages are based on the total number of points scored divided number of darts thrown (multiplied by 3 in this case to give a "3 dart average"). There were 16 matches where a player managed an average in excess of 100 per visit to the board. Phil Taylor achieved this during seven matches, Raymond van Barneveld six times. Roland Scholten, Ronnie Baxter and Peter Manley each averaged over 100 during one match in the competition. 

107.75 – Phil Taylor v Peter Manley (week 6)
106.79 – Phil Taylor v Colin Lloyd (week 1)
105.03 – Phil Taylor v Roland Scholten (final)
104.75 – Phil Taylor v Raymond van Barneveld (week 8)
104.35 – Raymond van Barneveld v Ronnie Baxter (week 10)
104.13 – Roland Scholten v Raymond van Barneveld (semi-final)
103.44 – Raymond van Barneveld v Wayne Mardle (week 10)
102.19 – Phil Taylor v Peter Manley (week 7)
101.33 – Ronnie Baxter v Raymond van Barneveld (week 10, Baxter lost match 2–8)
101.72 – Raymond van Barneveld v Colin Lloyd (week 7)
101.05 – Phil Taylor v Ronnie Baxter (week 3)
101.04 – Raymond van Barneveld v Phil Taylor (week 8, Barneveld lost match 6–8)
100.88 – Phil Taylor v Raymond van Barneveld (week 5)
100.69 – Raymond van Barneveld v Peter Manley (week 5)
100.55 – Raymond van Barneveld v Wayne Mardle (week 2)
100.35 – Peter Manley v Phil Taylor (week 6, Manley lost match 1–8)

External links
2006 Premier League Results & Statistics*Results of the 2006 Holsten Premier League
Report on the 2006 final
Report on van Barneveld's nine dart finish

Premier League Darts
Premier League Darts
Premier League Darts